Hedria is a genus of flies in the family Sciomyzidae. There is one described species in Hedria, H. mixta.

References

Further reading

External links

 

Sciomyzoidea genera